Hesperostipa is a genus of grasses in the family Poaceae.  Members of the genus are commonly known as needle-and-thread grass or needlegrass.

The Hesperostipa species, formerly called Stipa, are endemic to North America. The new name adds , as other Stipa species are found on the Eurasian continent (i.e., the eastern hemisphere).

Selected species
Hesperostipa comata (Trin. & Rupr.) Barkworth – needle-and-thread grass
Hesperostipa comata subsp. comata
Hesperostipa comata subsp. intermedia (Scribn. & Tweedy) Barkworth
Hesperostipa curtiseta (Hitchc.) Barkworth – Canadian needlegrass
Hesperostipa neomexicana (Thurb.) Barkworth – New Mexico needlegrass
Hesperostipa saxicola (Hitchc.) Valdés-Reyna & Barkworth
Hesperostipa spartea (Trin.) Barkworth – porcupine grass

References

External links
 

Pooideae
Bunchgrasses of North America
Poaceae genera